"Digital" is a song by English musician Goldie featuring American rapper KRS-One, released as the first single from Goldie's 1998 album Saturnz Return.

It reached number 13 on the UK Singles Chart on 1 November 1997 which is his highest-charting single along with "Temper Temper" (featuring Noel Gallagher). The single is influenced by then-emerging speed garage and one of the first attempts to blend drum and bass with rap. It samples "This Cut's Got Flavor" by Latee and "I'm Still #1" by Boogie Down Productions and was itself sampled in "Answers" by Lootpack featuring Quasimoto and "Sound of the Culture" by DJ Munja. "Digital" received mixed reviews from music critics even those favourable of album like Ryan Schreiber from Pitchfork.

Track listing 
"Digital" (Armand Van Helden's Speed Garage Mix) – 9:12
"Digital" (DJ Muggs Mix) – 4:29
"Digital" (Boymerang Mix) – 8:36
"Digital" (Original Mix) – 5:54

Personnel 
Design – Goldie, Jon Black, Sam Bennett
Engineering – Rob Playford
Rap – KRS-One
Photography – Phil Knott
Producing – Goldie, Rob Playford
Writing – Goldie, KRS-One, L. Parker, Rob Playford

Charts

References

External links 

 

1997 songs
1997 singles
Goldie songs
KRS-One songs
FFRR Records singles
UK garage songs